Antonio Roma (13 July 1932 – 20 February 2013) was an Argentine football goalkeeper.

Nicknamed Tarzan for the way of throwing himself for the ball, he started his professional career with Ferrocarril Oeste in 1955, where he played until 1959. He was then transferred, together with teammate Silvio Marzolini, to Boca Juniors, where he debuted in the victory of 3 April 1960 against Estudiantes de La Plata.

Roma stayed with Boca until his retirement in 1972, becoming one of the biggest idols of the club, with total of 323 matches in all competitions. With the club Roma won the Argentine League of 1962, 1964, 1965, and the Campeonato Nacional 1969 and 1970. In 1969, he kept  his goal clear for 783 minutes.

Probably the most remembered save by Antonio Roma was the penalty executed by Brazilian River's player Delem, that he sent to the corner. With only two rounds before the end of the 1962 championship, Boca and its all-time derby River Plate shared the first position at the local league. The decisive match was played at La Bombonera, Boca Juniors home stadium. Boca was ahead 1:0 when referee Nai Foino conceded a penalty to River. After the save, the public invaded the field delaying the continuation of the match for 11 minutes. River was not able to change the score, and Boca finally won that championship after defeating Estudiantes de La Plata in the next round.

Roma also played with the Argentina national football team, including at the 1962 FIFA World Cup and 1966 FIFA World Cup. He made a total of 42 appearances for his national team between 1956 and 1967.

References

External links

1932 births
2013 deaths
Argentine people of Italian descent
Argentine footballers
Argentina international footballers
Boca Juniors footballers
Argentine Primera División players
1962 FIFA World Cup players
1966 FIFA World Cup players
Association football goalkeepers
Footballers from Buenos Aires
Ferro Carril Oeste footballers